, Asiana Airlines offers regular passenger and cargo service to over 80 destinations (except seasonal charter destinations) in 26 countries from its two hub airports, Incheon International Airport and Gimpo International Airport in South Korea. Outside South Korea, the countries with the largest number of airports served by Asiana Airlines are China with 24, Japan with 9 and the United States with 10.

As of July 2020, Asiana Airlines operates between Incheon and 22 cities in China, and along with Korean Air is one of the two largest foreign airlines to operate into the People's Republic of China.

Since the COVID-19 pandemic was declared in January 2020, Asiana Airlines has suspended most domestic and international routes. , Asiana Airlines operates limited domestic and international routes.

List

References

Lists of airline destinations
Star Alliance destinations
Asiana Airlines